Idalopirdine (INN) (code names Lu AE58054,) is a potent and selective 5-HT6 receptor antagonist under development by Lundbeck as an augmentation therapy for the treatment of cognitive deficits associated with Alzheimer's disease and schizophrenia. As of October 2013 it is in phase III clinical trials.

A phase III trial of two different daily doses of Lu AE58054 on top of 10 mg of donepezil for mild-to-moderate Alzheimer's failed to meet its primary endpoint with either dose. Two further phase III trials failed too, the company confirmed in early 2017.

See also
 Cerlapirdine
 Latrepirdine

References

External links
 Lundbeck expands its pipeline - initiating phase II clinical trials with a new compound for the treatment of schizophrenia 
 Lundbeck initiates clinical phase II trials with Lu AE58054 as augmentation treatment in Alzheimer's disease 

5-HT6 antagonists
Antidementia agents
Nootropics
Tryptamines
Organofluorides
Fluoroarenes